Adult Contemporary is a chart published by Billboard ranking the top-performing songs in the United States in the adult contemporary music (AC) market.  In 1984, 18 songs topped the chart, based on playlists submitted by radio stations.  The chart was published under the title Adult Contemporary through the issue of Billboard dated October 13 and Hot Adult Contemporary thereafter.

In the year's first issue of Billboard the number one song was "Read 'Em and Weep" by Barry Manilow, which was in its third week at number one.  It held the top spot for four weeks in 1984 before being replaced by "Think of Laura" by Christopher Cross.  The most successful act on the AC chart in 1984 was Lionel Richie, who had three number ones and spent a total of fifteen weeks in the top spot, three times that achieved by any other act during the year. Billy Joel also had three chart-toppers during the year but only spent a total of five weeks at number one.  Richie, lead singer of the Commodores, had launched his solo career in 1982 and quickly reached superstar status.  He had the two longest-running number ones of 1984, spending six consecutive weeks atop the chart with "Hello" and five weeks with "Stuck on You".  While "Stuck on You" was at number one on the AC listing, he performed at the closing ceremony of the 1984 Summer Olympics.  Richie and Joel were the only acts with more than one chart-topper in 1984.

Three songs topped both the AC chart and Billboards all-genre listing, the Hot 100, in 1984, including Richie's "Hello".  In June, Cyndi Lauper topped both listings with "Time After Time" and in the fall Stevie Wonder reached number one on both charts with "I Just Called to Say I Love You".  The song, from the soundtrack of the film The Woman in Red, won the singer the Academy Award for Best Original Song.  In December, The Honeydrippers, a short-lived supergroup brought together by singer Robert Plant and featuring among others his former Led Zeppelin bandmate Jimmy Page, topped the chart with their cover version of the 1950s song "Sea of Love".  It was the first Billboard number one single for Plant and Page, surpassing the best position achieved by Led Zeppelin, who had achieved a string of number one albums but never gained a chart-topping single.  "Sea of Love" was replaced at number one by "Do What You Do" by Jermaine Jackson, which was the final chart-topper of the year.

Chart history

References

See also
1984 in music
List of artists who reached number one on the U.S. Adult Contemporary chart

1984
1984 record charts
1984 in American music